In quantum physics, the quantum inverse scattering method is a method for solving integrable models in 1+1 dimensions, introduced by L. D. Faddeev in 1979.  

The quantum inverse scattering method relates two different approaches:
the Bethe ansatz, a method of solving integrable quantum models in one space and one time dimension;
the Inverse scattering transform, a method of solving classical integrable differential equations of the evolutionary type.

This method led to the formulation of quantum groups. Especially interesting is the Yangian, and the center of the Yangian is given by the quantum determinant.

An important concept in the Inverse scattering transform is the Lax representation; the quantum inverse scattering method starts by the quantization of the Lax representation and reproduces the results of the Bethe ansatz.  In fact, it allows the Bethe ansatz to be written in a new form: the algebraic Bethe ansatz. This led to further progress in the understanding of quantum Integrable systems, for example:
a) the Heisenberg model (quantum),
b) the quantum Nonlinear Schrödinger equation (also known as the Lieb–Liniger model or the Tonks–Girardeau gas) and 
c) the Hubbard model.

The theory of correlation functions was developed : determinant representations, descriptions by differential equations and the Riemann–Hilbert problem.  Asymptotics of correlation functions (even for space, time and temperature dependence) were evaluated in 1991.

Explicit expressions for the higher conservation laws of the integrable models were obtained in 1989.

Essential progress was achieved in study of ice-type models: the bulk free energy of the 
six vertex model depends on boundary conditions even in the thermodynamic limit.

References

Exactly solvable models
Quantum mechanics